Hye-won is a Korean feminine given name. Its meaning differs based on the hanja used to write each syllable of the name. There are 23 hanja with the reading "hye" and 46 hanja with the reading "won" on the South Korean government's official list of hanja which may be registered for use in given names.

People
People with this name include:

Shin Yun-bok (1758–1813), pen name Hyewon, Joseon Dynasty male painter
Park Hye-won (born 1983), South Korean female short track speed skater
Eom Hye-won (born 1991), South Korean female badminton player
Kang Hye-won (born 1999), South Korean female singer

Fictional characters
Fictional characters with this name include:

Shim Hye-won, in 2003 South Korean television series Summer Scent
Kang Hye-won, in 2004 South Korean television series Full House
Han Hye-won, in 2006 South Korean film Now and Forever
Kim Hye-won, in 2010 South Korean television series The Slave Hunters
Park Hye-won, in 2010 South Korean television series Dandelion Family
Oh Hye-won, in 2014 South Korean television series Secret Love Affair
Choi Hye-won, in 2014 South Korean television series Gunman in Joseon

See also
List of Korean given names

References

Korean feminine given names